Ngāti Maru may refer to:
 Ngāti Maru (Hauraki), a tribe of Hauraki, New Zealand
 Ngāti Maru (Taranaki), a tribe of Taranaki, New Zealand
 Ngāti Maru, a subtribe of Rongowhakaata, a tribe of the Gisborne region, New Zealand